Hesterine Jannetje de Reus (born 6 December 1961) is a Dutch former soccer player who's later made a career as coach. She took charge of the China U-20 women team at the end of 2017.

Between 1983 and 1992 de Reus gained 43 caps as a player for the Netherlands women's national football team. In 1994 she began working for the Royal Dutch Football Association (KNVB) as a coach. In 2007, she became the coach for the Dutch national under-19 team. On 1 October 2010 she took up an appointment as technical director and coach of the Jordan women's national football team, who won the following month's 2010 Arabia Cup. In April 2011, three Jordanian players refused to play for de Reus's team because they suspected she was a lesbian.

On 4 June 2012 PSV Eindhoven unveiled de Reus as the new women's coach for season 2012–13, the first season for PSV in the women's BeNe League. PSV entered into a partnership with FC Eindhoven and played as PSV/FC Eindhoven. In early 2013 she left Eindhoven to coach the Australia women's national football team.

De Reus was sacked by Football Federation Australia in April 2014, after a player mutiny brought about by her outspoken personality and demanding coaching methods.

Managerial statistics

References

External links
 Profile at Topsport Amsterdam
 Hesterine Jannetje de Reus – UEFA profile

1961 births
Living people
Dutch women's footballers
Netherlands women's international footballers
Dutch football managers
Expatriate football managers in Jordan
Expatriate soccer managers in Australia
Dutch expatriate football managers
Women's national association football team managers
People from Zeewolde
Female association football managers
Australia women's national soccer team managers
Sportspeople from Flevoland
People from Albrandswaard
Women's association footballers not categorized by position
Dutch expatriate sportspeople in Australia
Dutch expatriate sportspeople in Jordan
Dutch expatriate sportspeople in China
PSV Eindhoven non-playing staff